Gustavo Augusto Poyet Domínguez (born 15 November 1967) is a Uruguayan professional football manager and former footballer. He is currently the head coach of the Greece national football team.

Poyet played as a midfielder and began his career with short spells at Grenoble and River Plate. He then spent seven years at Real Zaragoza, with whom he won the Copa del Rey and the UEFA Cup Winners' Cup. In 1997, Poyet moved to Chelsea on a free transfer and helped the club win the FA Cup and the UEFA Cup Winners' Cup. In 2001, he moved to Tottenham Hotspur, where he saw out the remainder of his career. He was also part of the Uruguay side which won the 1995 Copa América.

After his playing career ended, Poyet moved into coaching. He served as assistant manager to Dennis Wise at Swindon Town and Leeds United, and Juande Ramos at Tottenham Hotspur. In November 2009, Poyet was appointed manager of Brighton & Hove Albion and in his first full season led the club to promotion as League One Champions, for which he was named League One Manager of the Year by the LMA. In October 2013 he was hired by Premier League team Sunderland and guided them to the League Cup Final in his first season, but was sacked in March 2015 after a poor run of results. He later had spells at Superleague Greece side AEK Athens, La Liga club Real Betis, Chinese Super League team Shanghai Shenhua, Bordeaux of Ligue 1, and Universidad Católica in Chile, before being appointed as coach of Greece in 2022.

Playing career

Club career
Born in Montevideo, a goalscoring midfielder, he began his career with spells at Grenoble and River Plate. Poyet moved to Real Zaragoza in 1990; winning the Copa del Rey in 1994 and the Cup Winners' Cup a year later, beating Arsenal in the final. He became Zaragoza's longest-serving foreign player, and scored 60 goals in 240 games for the club.

Poyet joined Chelsea on a free transfer in June 1997. Not long into his first season at the London club, he suffered cruciate ligament damage, this meant he missed the victorious 1998 Football League Cup Final but recovered to play in the team's successful Cup Winners' Cup Final against VfB Stuttgart. The following year, he contributed 14 goals – making him the club's second highest scorer – to help Chelsea finish third in the Premiership, including a crucial headed goal in 1–0 win against Leeds United. He also scored the winner for Chelsea in the 1998 UEFA Super Cup against Real Madrid. In 1999–2000, he scored 18 goals (which again made him Chelsea's second highest scorer), with a scissors-kick volley against Sunderland, a long range strike against Lazio, and both of Chelsea's goals in the FA Cup semi-final against Newcastle United, among the most memorable, as the team won the FA Cup and reached the UEFA Champions League quarter-finals.

With the arrival of new manager Claudio Ranieri in September 2000, Chelsea was a team in transition. With Ranieri seeking to reduce the average age of the squad, Poyet became surplus to requirements and requested a transfer.

In 145 appearances for Chelsea, Poyet scored 49 goals.

Poyet joined Tottenham Hotspur in May 2001 for around £2.2 million. He scored 14 goals in his debut season for Spurs and helped his team reach the League Cup final, but they lost 2–1 to Blackburn Rovers. His time at the club was blighted by injuries, and he again sustained cruciate ligament damage in August 2002, but still managed to score 23 goals in 98 games.

International career
Poyet was a Uruguay international, making his international debut on 13 July 1993 in a friendly match against Peru (1–2). After 67 minutes, he was substituted by Carlos Aguilera.

Poyet helped his country win the Copa América in 1995. In doing so, he was voted as the best player in his position at the tournament.

He won 26 caps in total, scoring three goals.

Managerial career

Early coaching
In July 2006, he became a player and assistant manager at Swindon Town alongside ex-Chelsea teammate, Dennis Wise. Both Poyet and Wise were given permission to talk about forming the new Leeds United management team on 23 October 2006 and looked set to take the place of caretaker manager, John Carver, until Swindon withdrew permission due to disagreements over compensation. On 24 October 2006, Poyet was confirmed as assistant manager of Leeds with Dennis Wise as the manager.
On 29 October 2007, Poyet rejoined his former club Tottenham Hotspur to work alongside new head coach Juande Ramos as a first team coach with Marcos Álvarez as a fitness coach. During his first season as assistant manager at White Hart Lane, he won the 2007–08 League Cup, beating Chelsea 2–1 after extra time in the Final after a penalty from Dimitar Berbatov in normal time and a header early into extra time from Jonathan Woodgate.

On 25 October 2008, Poyet parted company with Tottenham Hotspur along with manager Juande Ramos, first team coach Marcos Álvarez and sporting director Damien Comolli.

Brighton & Hove Albion

On 10 November 2009, Poyet was announced as the new manager of English League One side Brighton & Hove Albion on a one-and-a-half-year contract. Former Tottenham teammate Mauricio Taricco was also announced as Poyet's assistant manager. He steered the club to safety as he had a brilliant start to his career at Brighton by going to Southampton and winning 3–1. He started the 2010–11 season by making a number of signings including Gordon Greer, Radostin Kishishev, Liam Bridcutt, Matt Sparrow, Casper Ankergren and Ashley Barnes. He also signed a new four-year contract along with his assistant Mauricio Taricco.

The season started  with five wins from the first eight games putting Brighton top of the League One table. Brighton started the year 2011 with a 5–0 home win on New Year's Day against Leyton Orient. Most notable was a run of eight straight league victories in March, leaving the club 13 points clear at the top with games in hand over all of their closest rivals with the exception of Southampton. Brighton secured promotion to the Championship following a 4–3 home win over Dagenham & Redbridge, Ashley Barnes scoring the winner in the 63rd minute. The League One title was clinched on 16 April 2011, as Brighton beat Walsall 3–1, having been top without slipping since the eighth game of the season and with four games of the season still to play. On 23 May 2011, Poyet was voted LMA League One Manager of the Year for his achievements in the 2010–11 season – his first full season as a football manager.

During pre-season 2011, Poyet twice broke the club's record transfer-fee in signing Will Buckley and Craig Mackail-Smith, and also brought in former Spain and Valencia playmaker Vicente on a free transfer. After an unbeaten start to the 2011–12 season, Poyet was named as Championship manager of the month for August 2011. Poyet shortly after signed a new and improved five-year contract to remain at the club until 2016. In March 2012, Poyet won the Outstanding Managerial Achievement Award at the Football League Awards ceremony, beating Crystal Palace manager Dougie Freedman and former Huddersfield Town boss Lee Clark.

On 23 June 2013, Brighton released an official statement declaring that Poyet had been informed that "his employment has been terminated with immediate effect". Poyet said that he was only made aware of his sacking when a member of the BBC production staff handed him a printout of the club statement, whilst working as a pundit for BBC Three's coverage of the Spain vs. Nigeria group game in the FIFA Confederations Cup.

Sunderland

On 8 October 2013, it was announced that Poyet had been appointed as Head Coach at Sunderland on a two-year contract, becoming the first Uruguayan to manage in the Premier League. Eleven days later in his first match in charge, they lost 4–0 away to Swansea City. His second game in charge, and first at the Stadium of Light, resulted in a 2–1 win against local rivals Newcastle United on 27 October.

In his first season in charge, he took Sunderland to the League Cup Final after a penalty shootout win over Manchester United in the semi-finals. On 19 April 2014, Poyet defeated José Mourinho in his first-ever home league defeat in the Premier League as Chelsea manager, a 2–1 win to Sunderland at Stamford Bridge. Poyet led Sunderland to a 2–0 win at home to West Bromwich Albion on 7 May to guarantee Premier League safety with one game remaining, performing "a miracle" in his own words by arresting a decline that saw Sunderland seven points adrift of safety as late as 7 April, when they lost 5–1 to Tottenham Hotspur. Defeat to Everton in their following league game made avoiding relegation look like a near impossible task for the club, but Sunderland, under Poyet's stewardship, earned 13 points out of a possible 15 in their following five league games.
Poyet signed a new two-year contract at Sunderland on 28 May 2014.

The club sacked Poyet on 16 March 2015. At the time of his sacking, they were in 17th place in the league, one point above the relegation places.

AEK Athens

On 29 October 2015, AEK Athens reported that Poyet had agreed in principle to be the club's manager until summer 2016. In February 2016, he guided his team to successive wins against neighbours Olympiacos and Panathinaikos. He was sacked on 19 April 2016 after the team finished third in the league and awaited a Greek Cup semi-final; the board had taken issue with him informing the press before them that he would leave at the end of the campaign.

Betis
On 9 May 2016, Poyet had signed a two-year deal with Real Betis. On 12 November 2016, he was sacked and replaced by Víctor Sánchez.

Shanghai Shenhua
On 29 November 2016, Poyet became the manager of Chinese Super League side Shanghai Shenhua. Despite of being blamed by public for poor performance in the league and resigning on 11 September, he was still appreciated by some fans for his contribution to the team's championship in 2017 Chinese FA Cup later in November, including a 1-0 home victory over classic rival Beijing Guoan in 4th round, and a 3-1 away victory over Shandong Luneng in quarter final.

Bordeaux
On 20 January 2018, Poyet became the manager of Ligue 1 side Bordeaux. In August, he was suspended by the club after criticising the sale of Gaëtan Laborde to Montpellier. He was subsequently fired and replaced by Ricardo Gomes on 5 September.

Universidad Católica

On 28 February 2021, Poyet became the manager of Chilean Primera División club Universidad Católica. He began his tenure by winning the delayed 2020 Supercopa de Chile against rivals Colo-Colo and made the last 16 of the 2021 Copa Libertadores, but left by mutual consent at the end of August with the worst campaign in the last 10 years.

Greece
On 3 February 2022, Poyet became the manager of the Greece national team. He guided the team to four victories from their four opening fixtures in League C of the 2022 UEFA Nations League, helping Greece earn promotion to League B for the following campaign.

Personal life
Poyet is married to Madelon González with whom he has two sons: Diego (born 1995) and Matias (born 1993). Diego is also a midfielder, making his professional debut in 2014 for Charlton Athletic before moving to West Ham United, and has represented England at youth international level.

Poyet's father was Olympic basketball player Washington Poyet, while his brother Marcelo also played the sport professionally in South America. Poyet introduced basketball to Sunderland academy training sessions, believing it to share many attributes with football, particularly marking.

Career statistics

International

Scores and results list Uruguay's goal tally first, score column indicates score after each Poyet goal.

Managerial statistics

Honours

Player
Real Zaragoza
 Copa del Rey: 1993–94
 UEFA Cup Winners' Cup: 1994–95

Chelsea
 FA Cup: 1999–2000
 FA Charity Shield: 2000
 UEFA Cup Winners' Cup: 1997–98
 UEFA Super Cup: 1998

Uruguay
 Copa América: 1995

Manager
Brighton & Hove Albion
 Football League One: 2010–11

Universidad Católica
Supercopa de Chile: 2020 

Individual
 League One Manager of the Year: 2010–11
 League One Manager of the Month: September 2010, March 2011
 Football League Award for Outstanding Managerial Achievement: 2011

References

External links

 Official website

1967 births
1995 Copa América players
AEK Athens F.C. managers
Association football midfielders
Brighton & Hove Albion F.C. managers
Chelsea F.C. players
Copa América-winning players
Expatriate footballers in England
Expatriate footballers in France
Expatriate footballers in Spain
Expatriate football managers in England
Expatriate football managers in Greece
Super League Greece managers
Grenoble Foot 38 players
La Liga players
Leeds United F.C. non-playing staff
Living people
Premier League players
Real Zaragoza players
Club Atlético River Plate (Montevideo) players
Footballers from Montevideo
Swindon Town F.C. players
Uruguayan beach soccer players
English Football League managers
Tottenham Hotspur F.C. non-playing staff
Tottenham Hotspur F.C. players
Uruguay international footballers
Uruguayan expatriate footballers
Uruguayan expatriate football managers
Uruguayan expatriate sportspeople in England
Uruguayan expatriate sportspeople in Greece
Uruguayan expatriate sportspeople in Spain
Uruguayan expatriate sportspeople in China
Uruguayan expatriate sportspeople in France
Uruguayan footballers
Uruguayan people of Spanish descent
Uruguayan people of French descent
Premier League managers
Sunderland A.F.C. managers
Real Betis managers
FC Girondins de Bordeaux managers
Club Deportivo Universidad Católica managers
La Liga managers
Ligue 1 managers
Expatriate football managers in Spain
Expatriate football managers in China
Expatriate football managers in France
Expatriate football managers in Chile
Chinese Super League managers
FA Cup Final players